The Kazakhstani Figure Skating Championships are the annual figure skating national championships held to crown the national champions of Kazakhstan. Skaters compete in the disciplines of men's singles, ladies' singles, pair skating, and ice dancing, across different levels. Not every event has been held in every year due to a lack of entries. In some years, guest skaters from neighbouring countries, such as Uzbekistan and Kyrgyzstan, are allowed to compete in the event.

Senior medalists

Men

Ladies

Pairs

Ice dance

Junior medalists

Men

Ladies

Ice dance

Novice medalists

Men

Ladies

References

External links
 interwiki Russian

Figure skating in Kazakhstan
Figure skating national championships